Detective Story can refer to the following things:

 Detective fiction, a genre of fiction
 Detective Story (play), a 1949 play by Sidney Kingsley
 Detective Story (1951 film), a film version of the play
 Tantei Monogatari (Detective Story), a Japanese TV series broadcast 1979 to 1980
 Detective Story (1983 film), a Japanese film directed by Kichitaro Negishi
 Detective Story (2007 film), a Japanese film directed by Takashi Miike
 Detective Story Magazine, a magazine of detective fiction that ran from 1915 to 1949
 A Detective Story, a short film from the 2003 short-film compilation The Animatrix
Detective Stories, a comic series in the Rivers of London universe